The Kohat University of Science and Technology (KUST) is a public university located at Kohat District, Khyber Pakhtunkhwa, Pakistan. It was established in 2001. The university was inaugurated by the Governor of Khyber Pakhtunkhwa, Lt. Gen. Syed Iftikhar Hussain Shah(late).

History

KUST attained the status of degree-awarding institution vide NWFP ordinance No. XXIII of 2001 and the subsequent notification No. Legis: 1 (12) 2001/4451-56, of August 30, 2001.

The university was founded with four institutes - Institute of Information Technology, Institute of Management Sciences, Institute of Education and Research and Department of Microbiology. These offered two-year and four-year bachelor degrees and two-year master degrees in 2004. Later on, the university was expanded by establishing departments in physics, chemistry, botany, zoology (Dr. Farzana Perveen has established department of Zoology KUST from the beginning and brings it up) and microbiology. These departments offer B.S. (Hons.), M.Sc., M.Phil. and Ph.D. degree programs.

The first vice chancellor of the university was Prof. Dr. Sher Ali Khan Shinwari.

KUST is ranked No. 22 in the general category of Higher Education Commission (Pakistan) rankings.

Faculties

Physical & Numerical Sciences
 Institute of Computing
 Institute of Numerical Sciences
 Department of Physics

Social Sciences

 Institute of Business Studies
 Institute of Education & Research
 Department of English
 Department of Islamic Studies
 Department of Economics
 Department of Pakistan Studies
 Department of Journalism & Mass Communication
 Department of Education Psychology
 Department of Social Work 
 Department of Sociology

Biological Sciences
 Department of Biotechnology & Genetics Engineering
 Department of Microbiology
 Department of Botany
 Department of Zoology
 Department of Environmental Sciences
 Department of Medical Lab Technologies

Faculty of Chemical & Pharmaceutical Sciences
 Department of Chemistry
 Department of Pharmacy

Allied Health Sciences 
 Doctor of physical therapy 
 Bachelor of nursing
 Bachelor of Emergency Care

Academics

Degree programs 
KUST offered the following degree programs. The regular duration of BS and MS/M Phil degree programs are 4 and 2 years, respectively.

Vice Chancellors 
List of Vice Chancellors from the date of establishment:
 Dr Sher Ali Khan Shinwari (Late) (2001 - 2002)
 Khalid Niazi (2003 - 2004)
 Ihsan Illahi (2004)
 Zabta Khan Shinwari (2004 - 2006)
 Lutfullah Kakakheil (2007 - 2010.
 Nasir Jamal Khattak (2011 - 2014)
 Jamil Ahmed (2017–2020)
 Syed Tasleem Hussain [Acting VC] (March 2020 - 2021
 Prof. Dr. Sardar Khan (2021–Present)

References

External links
KUST official website

Universities and colleges in Kohat District
Educational institutions established in 2001
2001 establishments in Pakistan
Kohat District
Public universities and colleges in Khyber Pakhtunkhwa